Aptos Hills-Larkin Valley is an unincorporated community in Santa Cruz County, California, United States. It is identified as one of several small communities with a combined population of 24,402 forming the unincorporated town of Aptos by the local Chamber of Commerce along with:
 Cabrillo
 Seacliff, south of State Route 1, west of Aptos Creek
 Rio Del Mar, south of State Route 1, from Aptos Creek southeast to Seascape
 Seascape, south of State Route 1, centered on Seascape Beach Resort

For statistical purposes, the United States Census Bureau has defined Aptos Hills-Larkin Valley as a census-designated place (CDP). The census definition of the area may not precisely correspond to local understanding of the area with the same name. The population was 2,383 as of the 2020 United States census.

Geography
Aptos Hills-Larkin Valley is located at  (36.960860, -121.831386).

Demographics

2010
At the 2010 census Aptos Hills-Larkin Valley had a population of 2,381. The racial makeup of Aptos Hills-Larkin Valley was 1,936 (81.3%) White, 12 (0.5%) African American, 5 (0.2%) Native American, 55 (2.3%) Asian, 1 (0.0%) Pacific Islander, 295 (12.4%) from other races, and 77 (3.2%) from two or more races. Hispanic or Latino of any race were 541 people (22.7%).

The census reported that 99.5% of the population lived in households and 0.5% lived in non-institutionalized group quarters.

There were 872 households, 246 (28.2%) had children under the age of 18 living in them, 511 (58.6%) were opposite-sex married couples living together, 58 (6.7%) had a female householder with no husband present, 43 (4.9%) had a male householder with no wife present.  There were 60 (6.9%) unmarried opposite-sex partnerships, and 5 (0.6%) same-sex married couples or partnerships. 183 households (21.0%) were one person and 64 (7.3%) had someone living alone who was 65 or older. The average household size was 2.72.  There were 612 families (70.2% of households); the average family size was 3.08.

The age distribution was 454 people (19.1%) under the age of 18, 193 people (8.1%) aged 18 to 24, 470 people (19.7%) aged 25 to 44, 932 people (39.1%) aged 45 to 64, and 332 people (13.9%) who were 65 or older.  The median age was 46.9 years. For every 100 females, there were 103.3 males.  For every 100 females age 18 and over, there were 106.3 males.

The homeowner vacancy rate was 0.6%; the rental vacancy rate was 3.6%. 80.3% of the population lived in owner-occupied housing units and 19.2% lived in rental housing units.

2000

At the 2000 census there were 2,361 people, 845 households, and 622 families in the CDP. The racial makeup of the CDP was 84.50% White, 0.64% African American, 0.38% Native American, 1.86% Asian, 0.30% Pacific Islander, 7.62% from other races, and 4.70% from two or more races. Hispanic or Latino of any race were 15.21%.

Of the 845 households 33.5% had children under the age of 18 living with them, 61.5% were married couples living together, 8.8% had a female householder with no husband present, and 26.3% were non-families. 17.6% of households were one person and 6.2% were one person aged 65 or older.  The average household size was 2.79 and the average family size was 3.10.

The age distribution was 23.6% under the age of 18, 6.3% from 18 to 24, 27.1% from 25 to 44, 32.7% from 45 to 64, and 10.4% 65 or older.  The median age was 42 years. For every 100 females, there were 100.6 males.  For every 100 females age 18 and over, there were 97.6 males.

The median household income was $70,417 and the median family income  was $75,359. Males had a median income of $60,898 versus $42,500 for females. The per capita income for the CDP was $32,890.  About 3.6% of families and 3.9% of the population were below the poverty line, including 4.0% of those under age 18 and 4.8% of those age 65 or over.

Government

See also
 San Francisco Bay Area

References

Census-designated places in Santa Cruz County, California
Aptos, California
Census-designated places in California